Mosquitos is the second solo album by Stan Ridgway. It was released in 1989 on Geffen Records.

Track listing
 "Heat Takes a Walk" - 2:43
 "Lonely Town" - 4:09
 "Goin' Southbound" - 4:42
 "Dogs" - 4:05
 "Can't Complain" - 3:49
 "Peg and Pete and Me" - 4:41
 "Newspapers" - 2:41
 "Calling Out to Carol" - 4:04
 "The Last Honest Man" - 4:01
 "A Mission in Life" - 5:53

Personnel
Adapted from the Mosquitos liner notes.
Stan Ridgway - vocals, harmonica, piano, guitar
Eric Williams, Marc Ribot - guitar
Joe Ramirez, Tim Landers - bass guitar
Joe Berardi - drums
Steve Reid - percussion
Bernard Hall, Jim Lang - keyboards
Pietra Wexstun - keyboards, backing vocals
Larry Grennan, Tori Amos - background vocals
Steve Berlin - saxophone on "Dogs"
Van Dyke Parks - string arrangement on "Heat Takes a Walk"
Joe Chemay - background vocals on 2

Accolades

Chart positions

Singles

References

1989 albums
Stan Ridgway albums
Geffen Records albums